The 2019 Rutland County Council election took place on 2 May 2019 to elect members of Rutland County Council in England. This was on the same day as other local elections. New boundaries were used in this election and the number of councillors increased from 26 to 27.

Results summary

Results by ward

Barleythorpe

Braunston & Martinsthorpe

Cottesmore

Exton

Greetham

Ketton

Langham

Lyddington

Normanton

Oakham North East

Oakham North West

Oakham South

Ryhall & Casterton

Uppingham

Whissendine

By-elections

Ryhall & Casterton

Oakham South

Oakham North West

Ryhall & Casterton

Uppingham

Oakham South

References

External links 

2019 English local elections
May 2019 events in the United Kingdom
2019